Superheist is an Australian metal band, which formed in 1993. They have released two EPs, thirteen singles, one compilation/live album and four studio albums, two of which, 2001's The Prize Recruit and 2002's Identical Remote Controlled Reactions, reached the top 20 on the ARIA Albums Chart. After a twelve-year hiatus, their 2016 comeback album "Ghosts of the Social Dead" reached No. 3 on the AIR Charts and remained in the Top 10 for four weeks.

Four of the group's singles, "Crank the System" (November 2000), "Bullet" (March 2001), "7 Years" (May 2002) and "A Dignified Rage" (September 2002), each peaked in the Top 50 on the related ARIA Singles Chart. At the ARIA Music Awards of 2001 Kalju Tonuma was nominated for Producer of the Year and Engineer of the Year for his work on The Prize Recruit. The following year at the 2002 ceremony, "A Dignified Rage" was nominated for Engineer of the Year for Norton and Adam Rhodes. The group disbanded by February 2004 and issued a posthumous album, New, Rare, Live in November of that year. In August 2016 it was announced that the band had reformed and they subsequently released a new album, Ghosts of the Social Dead, on 28 October 2016. Following another lineup change in 2017, Superheist released their fourth album Sidewinder on 3 May 2019, and their fifth album MMXX on 1 July 2022.

History

Formation and early period (1993–1996)
Superheist were formed in Frankston, Victoria in 1993. The original line-up was Rod "Berger" McLeod on vocals, DW Norton on guitar, Sean "Seanheist" Pentecost on drums, Fetah Sabawi on keyboards and samples, and Adrian Sudborough on bass. The band was originally to be named Orgheist, which was inspired by the European grind core bands that they were influenced by at the time.

The name was soon altered to Superheist, Berger supplied the "Super" while Norton provided the "Heist". McLeod and Norton had met at Overport primary school in Frankston, Victoria in 1980 and later attended Frankston High School together. Sean Pentecost was a mutual friend who worked at a local music store, Frankston Guitar Village, and had previously played with Norton, Mcleod and Sudborough in the alt rock band Big Pop Monsters. Superheist's first live performance was at the 21st Century Dance Club, Frankston supporting the Cosmic Psychos. In 1994 they issued a five-track extended play cassette, Apocalypse, which was recorded at Backbeach Studios in Rye, Victoria and later distributed by Warhead records, The band's style at this early stage was grindcore, in the Napalm Death mould and incorporated synth tones, samples and clean vocals mixed amongst the brutal blast beats and death growls. 
The band's focus was to push the boundaries of extreme metal whilst introducing pop and nu-wave inspired melodies and hook lines. The demo was met with rave reviews across the country and as the band began touring nationally they quickly gained a loyal and fanatic following. Later that year bassist Sudborough was replaced with Adam "Donut" Donath and the next year was spent touring the country with bands such as In:Extremis, Damaged and Beanflipper. Superheist were now a regular feature of the Melbourne grind scene and played at such venues as The GB and The Hell Club, the band were learning their craft and honing what would eventually become the foundation for a world class live show.  In early December 1995 they appeared at the annual Metal for the Brain festival in Canberra, which raised funds for the National Brain Injury Foundation. This pivotal performance helped the band set themselves up for the next few years to come. They returned for the 1996 festival but by that time Seanheist had left the group due to his waning interest in playing extreme metal. Aaren "Suds" Suttil (1974–2006) of Dreadnaught replaced him on drums.

Chrome Matrix (1997–1998)
In September 1997, the band signed to Melbourne's Shock Records on its subsidiary label Cutthroat and released a five-track EP, Chrome Matrix. This EP showed a shift from traditional grindcore to a more polished industrial style of death metal. More samples and clean vocals crept into the sound along with more emphasis on keyboards and loops. The band even experimented with re-mixes with the track "Platinum Matrix" The epic "Subhuman" showcased the versatility of McLeod's vocals and clever lyrics. The EP also housed two hidden tracks from the Apocalypse demo, Retarded Barbie and Perfect World. During the recording bassist Adam "Donut" Donath severed his thumb in an industrial accident and was not able to finish his parts. The remaining bass parts for the EP were completed by Norton, while Donut recovered still unsure of his ability to ever play the bass again. Local Melbourne artist Barney "Barnaby Butters" Hughes (deceased) joined the group temporarily to assist on bass guitar duties for several live shows.
More line-up problems plagued the band with drummer Aaren Suttil's commitments to Dreadnaught increasing, he chose to leave the band on good terms. In:Extremis drummer Adam Messenger filled in for the next run of live shows and recorded a number of studio tracks with the band including "Times Killing" and "Pocket Full of Lies." These tracks appear on the band's 2004 release New Rare Live
In late 1998, After a meeting and an exchange of demos between Berger, DW and Seanheist at the Esplanade Hotel in St.Kilda, Seanheist rejoined the group. Excited by the new sound and the shift away from Grindcore/ Industrial death metal into a more nu-metal vein, songwriting continued, and the foundations were laid for what would eventually become the 8 Miles High EP and the birth of the classic Superheist bouncing metal sound. The post Chrome Matrix demos included early versions of Karma, Fluid and Syncin' In. Chris Ainsworth (A friend of Back Beach Studios owner Mark Rachelle) temporarily took up keyboards and samples duties while Fetah Sabawi travelled overseas. Superheist then went on to play a series of shows up and down the east coast. With no release for well over a year, the band struggled to maintain numbers at live shows. In 1998 Superheist announced bass guitarist Simon "Si" Durrant, from Adelaide-based industrial death metalers, In:Extremis would be the band's full-time replacement for the injured Donut who never regained his full playing ability.

8 Miles High and the beginning of commercial success (1998–2000)
The beginning of 1998, Fetah returned to Australia and the band began recording tracks for their debut album, which eventually became the eight-track EP, 8 Miles High. They band had already released the single Two-Faced (Check Your Head Up) in 1998 and followed it up with a second 4 track single "Karma" in early 1999/  The group went on to perform on the Vans Warped Tour, and then supported Fear Factory on their tour of Australia's east coast. In June 1999 Superheist toured nationally backing Sepultura, Late that year after a heavy touring schedule Bassist Si Durrant went berserk in a hotel room in Brisbane causing hundreds of dollars worth of damage. The band was chased out of town by the Queensland Police and subsequently, Durrant mutually left the band and returned to Adelaide where he joined a short-lived project, Screwface:13. He was replaced in August by Melbourne session bass player Drew Dedman (ex Iconklast), who had met DW (by this time a well known studio producer) while recording bass tracks for Toecutter's "Lost Culture" at Back Beach Recording studio. A brief East Coast and South Australian tour followed with varying degrees of success. With the band's sound changing quiet dramatically, some fans struggled to connect with the new direction. Returning to Melbourne, the band filmed their first music video for the third single Have Your Way. Although never officially released, the Have Your Way single was distributed by Shock as promotion for the later release of 8 Miles High and has become highly sought after by collectors.
In October 1999, Superheist recorded a cover of Walls by the Flowers at the ABC studios in South Melbourne. This track was featured by national radio station Triple J as part of Aus music month in November. A regional Victorian support with the Screaming Jets, a return to Canberra for Metal for the Brain on the 28th and a handful of local and East coast shows. The band finally got its first taste of a big summer festival stage by getting an early spot on Falls Festival, New Year's Eve. This performance allowed the band to showcase their new sound to a much larger audience and won the hearts of many with a blistering live show. At Shock Records, Shagpile label was discontinued and Superheist had neither the budget nor time to record new tracks with Dedman for a full studio album, so 8 Miles High was cut down to 8 tracks and released as an EP on 24 January. Although featured on the artwork and credited as bass player, all the bass tracks on 8 Miles High were played by either Si Durrant or DW Norton. The EP's opening track "Pulse" received airplay on national radio network, Triple J. It was later included on a various artists' compilation album, Full Metal Racket.  In January 2000, Dedman finally joined as a full-time member. With Dedman's highly skilled bass playing, the band's rhythm section had never sounded better and the stage was set for Superheist to take things to the next level. 
8 Miles High had made a significant impact on the Australian alternative charts, Pulse, Two-Faced, Karma and Have You Way were receiving significant airplay. This led to a main support slot with Grinspoon on their Australian tour in February. This tour effective broke the band on a national level. As a result of the success of the tour and 8 Miles High, the band was approached by Gregg Donovan of Step2 artist management (Grinspoon, Airbourne) who offered them a management contract.  "Pulse" was shelved in favour of a remixed, rereleased version of 2 faced. The band shot a film clip for the new version of the tune which was filmed in Melbourne and the song was re-released to radio as a promo single by Shock records. The CD sleeve featured a new band logo more in the style of US nu-metal band Limp Bizkit. This was done without the band's permission and was promptly removed from circulation after complaints from the band. Superheist's relationship with Shock Records was often tested with the label making numerous ill-fated decisions without consulting the band.

The Prize Recruit (2000–2002)
In mid 2000, the band began writing and recording demos for their debut album. Producer Kalju Tonuma, (Bodyjar, Hunters and Collectors, 28 Days, The Mavis's), was brought on board for the project. Around 30 demos were recorded by the band at this time. "Crank the System", released in November 2000 was the first single and also their first for the new Shock Records subsidiary, Pivotal. The film clip was filmed in an old warehouse in Northern Beaches, Sydney. There was a callout on Triple J in the morning of the shoot for people to turn up to be featured as the "cage climbers" The song peaked at No. 45 on the ARIA Singles Chart and the clip received high rotation on ABC's Rage, MTV and cable music channel Channel V. The single contained a B-side called "Bullet for You", a track that was initially scrapped for the release of the Prize Recruit and was recorded at Back Beach during initial demoing for the album. This would eventually be slightly reworked, re-recorded and released as Bullet and become the second single for the album released in March 2001. Some would say Bullet became the band's most popular live track.   In April 2001, 8 years after their inception, Superheist launched their first full-length studio album, The Prize Recruit, The album debuted at No. 12 on the ARIA Albums Chart. A reviewer for Rolling Stone described it as "what the new heavy breed should sound like". Theprp.com website's Wookubus felt the band "continue to evolve and each facet of their aural expression has been stepped up a notch, from the more encompassing use of programming to the stronger vocal variation and sleeker song structures" with the album generally "a very lush and colorful ride that the listener can figuratively slip right through, with little to no snags. Sure there are a few moments where things become a little too overtly radio friendly or sound a bit commercially focused, but with the bulk of the material included representing an eclectic blend of energetic modern metal crunch, such things are easy enough to overlook".
The Prize Recruit was recorded predominantly at Melbourne's Sing Sing studio and was mixed by Rick Will (Incubus) at Studios 301 in Sydney. Vocals and overdubs for the album were recorded at a beach house in Portsea Victoria. At the ARIA Music Awards of 2001 Tonuma was nominated for Producer of the Year and Engineer of the Year for the album. The record was mastered in the U.S. by Stephen Marcussen (Alice In Chains, Fear Factory, Aerosmith, Foo Fighters). In March of the following year, a Shock Records representative claimed that the label had spent $250–300,000 on the album and despite sales approaching 35,000 units they were still short of covering their expenses.[19] The second single from the album, "Bullet", had appeared in March 2001, which peaked at No. 45. The album's third single, "Step Back/Slide" (July), had less chart success although it reached the top 100.
In August Superheist supported Eminem at his Sydney and Melbourne concerts. An odd choice for the support slot, but Superheist lapped up the attention and played to over 25,00 people in two nights. Superheist's popularity was at an all-time high. A sold out 40 show Australian tour, magazine covers, national airplay on Triple J,and pay TV's Channel V and a huge live following, the band was ready for the next phase.

In late October 2001, Superheist embarked on their first US tour. With US management duties taken up by Gary Avila or Bigtime Management Paparoach the band based themselves in West Hollywood. Their first live show was a showcase at SIR Studios in Hollywood in front of a packed room full of record company executives and journalists. Superheist had come to America with a huge hype, and the industry was out in force to see what the buzz was all about. The band played a tight and energetic set. The onlookers suitably impressed. Over the next few weeks a bidding war began for the signature of the band and a US record deal. With commitments back in Australia, the band left America a flew home on 5 September 2001. On 11 September 2001 a devastating terrorist attack on New York's twin towers effectively all negotiations and communication with perspective record labels was lost until February 2002. By then all the interest in signing Superheist was gone. This was a defining moment for Supeheist. The band felt they had missed their calling. Unrest set in amongst some members. Even still, song writing continued. Norton moving the sound away from "rap rock" to a more straight rock metal sound. This did not sit well with vocalist Berger. Further strain on the relationship occurred as Berger distanced himself from the band. In a board meeting set up by management Berger stated he would "only play the big shows and the band would be dropped by the record company should he decide to leave". In mid-November Superheist was set to hit the road with the launch of the Channel V Music Bus. The night before the tour was to begin, the band was played a warm-up show at an all ages event at Berwick youth centre. Mcleod claimed to be unwell on the night and refused to go on stage, the event was sold out and Superheist refused set to cancel the show at the last minute. The band desperately looked for a fill in vocalist. They first approached Wes from Another Race and then finally Joey Biro from one of the earlier supports, From the Inside, not only did Joey know all the Superheist songs, delivered an amazing performance that shocked the crowd and the band. Berger refuse to go on the Channel V Music Bus tour so Superheist invited Joey Biro to be his replacement for the shows. The next few days Biro stayed on with the band and launched the channel V music bus through regional Victoria and NSW. With live national TV broadcasts revealing a fill in singer and shocking fans across the country. During the chaotic week, played out on national television, it became clear to the rest of the band that McLeod no longer shared the commitment and enthusiasm and the band no longer trusted him as their lead singer. He was given a final ultimatum and after consultation with management and record label was fired from the band and replaced by Biro that same week. In 2002 Superheist was to play every major festival in Australia including a main stage slot on the coveted BIG DAY OUT. The shows were a huge success with Biro winning over the fans with his heartfelt performances and powerful voice.

Identical Remote Controlled Reactions (2002–2004)
 Following the hugely successful Big Day Out festival in January 2002, the group began work on their second album, Identical Remote Controlled Reactions (September 2002). Recorded at Melbourne's Sing Sing Studios and co-produced by dw Norton and Adam Rhodes (The Dirty Three), the album peaked at No. 20 on the national ARIA Chart.
The lead single, "7 Years", had appeared in May 2002, which peaked at No. 29 – the group's highest-charting single. It was followed in August by a semi-acoustic rock ballad, "A Dignified Rage", which peaked at No. 50. At the ARIA Music Awards of 2002, Norton and Rhodes were nominated for Engineer of the Year for "A Dignified Rage".
IRCR introduced new vocalist Joey Biro in bold fashion. The sound was generally heavier than The Prize Recruit but showed a maturity in the songwriting and playing. Biro's emotive vocal style lending to a more epic version of Superheist's bouncing heavy rock riff style. In July 2003 the band went to America for a second time with the hope of recapturing the interest lost after 11 September. The band played solid shows at the Viper Room and the Roxy and several showcases but failed to get that elusive major International record deal they had come so close to only a year earlier. The dejected members returned to Australia. At this point something clearly changed within the band. After a run of not so successful east coast tours and spot shows late in the year, Superheist was dropped by Step2 Artist management and internal chaos was rife amongst the band. After almost 2 years of solid touring, back to back albums and a lead vocalist change the cracks were starting to appear. The band played all major rock festivals late in 2002 and finished the year with a disastrous New Year's Eve show in Hastings, Victoria. Bassist Drew Dedman, feeling disillusioned after a tumultuous few months, quit the band that night and returned home to North coast NSW refusing to speak to the band for the first few months of 2003. Nevertheless, the band continued to write and record demos for the third album without a bass player, Norton recorded the bass on the demos during this time. In 2003 (add date) Superheist were asked to play the Crusty Demons of Dirt Nine Lives Tour, after some lengthy discussion the band was able to persuade Dedman to return to Melbourne and rejoin the band for the tour and begin writing and rehearsing again. On 8 August 2003, the band recorded a live set a The Corner Hotel in Richmond, Victoria that was set to be released as their first live album. This gig would later be released as disc 2 of New, rare, Live. Superheist were initially billed to appear at Metal for the Brain on 20 December, however, in October they cancelled their appearance. The band's final tour was in North Queensland during December, the demoing of the new album was taking a long time, failure to get new management on board, inconsistent performances and tensions between Norton and Biro flared to breaking point in the final month of touring. Superheist returned to Melbourne, Biro went AWOL and was eventually fired from the band in January. More demoing was done in early 2004 but to no avail. In February 2004 Norton announced that Superheist had disbanded.
During their career Superheist had achieved significant chart success with four singles appearing in the Top 50 and both of its studio albums entering the Top 20. Superheist was seen as a trail blazer for heavy music in Australia. Taking heavy down tuned guitars to the mainstream masses.

New, Rare, Live and post Heist (2004–2015)
With a stack of unreleased material and the demos for the third album sitting gathering dust, Norton contacted Shock records with the idea of releasing the songs as a "goodbye" record. The demos were completed and mixed by Norton on his own at Backbeach Studios. The double album was compiled using unreleased material from 8 Miles High, The Prize Recruit and IRCR eras as well as the unheard new demos. Norton also added a track called "The Road" that was written in collaboration with Cam Baines of Bodyjar and Phil Rose of Nursery Crimes. Baines recorded the vocals for this track in Norton's "Cabin in the woods" in a remote part of Victoria. "The Road" opens the album followed by four of the new demo tracks and a number of rareities including the title track of the 2000 EP 8 Miles High that was omitted from the original release. In November 2004 the posthumous compilation album, New, Rare, Live, was released by Shock Records as a 2-CD set. Artwork was contributed by Melbourne designer Richard DeSilva who also worked with the band on Identical Remote Controlled Reactions.
There has been three attempts of reformation since the band's breakup in 2004. In 2006 Norton and Dedman started demoing new tracks with Matt "Skitz" Sanders from Damaged on drums, Seanheist had injured his knee and ankle and was unable to commit to recording at this time. Three new songs were recorded but were never fully finished and were soon shelved. The second attempt at reformation was in 2008 with the lineup of Biro, Norton, Seanheist and Dedman rehearsing some old songs and jamming new material a handful of times. Personality clashes, old grievances and just bad timing just made the reformation impossible to go ahead. In 2012 All five members of the band from the IRCR line-up finally caught up and met at the album's 10-year Anniversary party at Norton's bar (Whole Lotta Love) in Melbourne, talks of reforming were once again on the table, but nothing eventuated.

Norton went on to form Walk The Earth with good friend Richard De Silva. The band consisted of two members of Melbourne grind legends Jamie Ludbrook and Matt "Skitz" Sanders. The critically acclaimed "Rampant Calamities" EP was released on Norton's Faultine Records label in 2005 and the band shot to the top of the heavy music scene in Australia touring nationally with Mudvayne, Slipknot and Hatebreed. With interest from Roadrunner Records in the U.S. the band was set for big things. Tensions between the band a vocalist Jamie Ludbrook ultimately lead to the front man's departure and after trying various other singers and recording the unreleased EP "A Winsome Savage" with frontman and good friend Matt "Cuz" Curry, the band struggled to find time for another serious attempt and in 2009 went into hiatus. Norton took time out from music, retiring from studio producing in 2011 and going into business. He is the co-owner of East Brunswick Tattoos and Whole Lotta Love bar in Melbourne. He is also the director of several successful companies. In 2014 after a trip to Egypt he returned to music. Writing and recording material for his solo project RIFLEMAN. dw Norton is dedicated vegan and has tentatively titled his solo album I Vegan. Drew Dedman went on to form an improvised jazz band, The Lounge Machine in 2004, and played with Melbourne drum and bass act K-Oscillate in 2005–2006.  In 2008 he reunited with Joey Biro and they formed the band metal core band Lanstrum. This short lived project released 3 demo singles. Exceptional Remedy, The Eclipse and One the Same. The band split up during the recording of their debut album in 2010 due to ongoing personality clashes. Dedman has since played with experimental electronic band XXIII and in late 2015 joined Melbourne rockers the Arcane Saints.

Return and Ghosts of the Social Dead (2016–2019)

On 26 June 2016, Superheist announced their return on their Instagram page with a new album titled Ghosts of the Social Dead, released on 28 October. It was also announced a few weeks later that former Electrik Dynamite drummer Benny Clark had joined as a replacement for original drummer, Pentecost, who could not commit to the bands reformation due to personal reasons.

In August, the band released the first single and video from the album, "Hands Up High", and revealed Ezekiel Ox (Full Scale Revolution, ex-Mammal, Over-reactor) as their new vocalist. The filmclip was produced and directed by Gareth McGilvray. A second single, "Fearing Nothing", was released on 7 October. The track was recorded and produced by Jay Baumgardner at NRG studios in North Hollywood. The music video was produced and directed by Brian Cox from Flarelight Films, it was shot in a house in the Hollywood Hills.

What followed was a successful capital cities tour, some shows sold out. During this tour the filmed their third clip for the album, the song "Wolves in Your Headspace".

In early 2017, Superheist began announcing new shows interstate and the artwork for the 'Scorched Earth' national tour appeared.

In late January 2017, Benny Clark was asked to leave the band, Dedman then quit Superheist to pursue what his partner described on social media as a "bromance" with Clark.

Norton and Ox will continue to write the band's material, and have completed writing the band's next single " Raise Hell" which will be released in late February 2017. On 1 February 2017, Via the Music.com.au, Norton and Ox announced that previous member Si Durrant would be taking over bass duties, joining live members Gotcher and Sorenson on tour, with the band fulfilling their announced QLD tour dates.

Two days later Superheist announced via their Facebook page that John Sankey will be the new drummer for the upcoming tour, getting the biggest attention the band has ever received.

On 24 April 2018, the band announced on their Facebook a "Now & Then" package release that included a Remastered version of their demo "Apocalypse", a new six-track EP titled "Lights" and a greatest hits album titled The History Between Us; all these were released Friday, 27 April.

Sidewinder and departure of Ezekiel Ox (2019–2020)
On 3 April 2019, the band released a new song titled "The Riot" and had announced that their fourth album Sidewinder would be released on 3 May 2019.
The new album will be the first on new label Black Mountain Music created by Superheist founder dw Norton. Recorded and mixed at Norton's Black Mountain Sound Studio, Sidewinder is a continuation from the "Raise Hell" release with its use of 8 string guitars. 
In early April 2019 Superheist embarked on the inaugural HeistFest tour around Australia along with side Alaskan heavyweights 36 Crazyfists.
The current line up of Norton, Ox, Gotcher, Sankey and Durrant has proven to be the most dynamic combination both live and in the studio in the band's 25-year history.

On 1 July 2020, Ezekiel Ox announced through his social media pages that he had left Superheist. No further explanation was given.

Original Superheist drummer Sean Pentecost died on 18 August 2020.

MMXX (2020–present)
On 1 December 2020, Superheist leaked a new song titled "Medicated", before removing it several hours later, and announced that their new album MMXX would be released in February 2021. On 10 December 2020, the band released the first official single from the album titled "Seize the Day", which was recorded in memory of their original drummer, Sean "Seanheist" Pentecost, and released as a free digital download on Bandcamp. The song featured both guitarist DW Norton and bassist Si Durrant on vocals, officially taking over from Ezekiel Ox following his departure from the band in July 2020, and also featured former member Drew Dedman on bass. The release of the album ended up being delayed until July 2022.

In May 2022, it was announced MMXX would be released on 1 July.

Members

Current members

Studio members
 DW Norton – guitar (1993–2004, 2016–present); lead vocals (2020–present); backing vocals (1993–2004, 2016–2020)
 Simon Durrant – bass guitar (1997–1999, 2017–present); unclean vocals (2020–present)
 Keir Gotcher – guitar (2017–present)
 John Sankey – drums (2017–present)

Touring members
 Andy Sorenson – keyboards (2017–present)

Past members

Studio members
According to sources:
 Ezekiel Ox – vocals (2016–2020)
 Drew Dedman – bass guitar (1999–2004, 2016–2017)
 Benny Clark – drums (2016–2017)
 Joey Biro – lead vocals (2001–2004)
 Sean Pentecost – drums (1993–1995, 1998–2004; died 2020)
 Fetah Sabawi – keyboards (1993–1996, 1999–2004)
 Rod McLeod – lead vocals (1993–2001)
 Adam Donath – bass guitar (1993–1997)
 Aaren "Suds" Suttil – drums (1996–1997)
 Adam Messenger – drums (1996)
 Adrian Sudborough – bass guitar (1993)

Touring members
 Chris Ainsworth – keyboards (1996-1998)
 Barney Hughes – bass guitar (1997–1997)
 Richard De Silva – guitar (2016–2017)

Timeline

Discography

Albums

Extended plays

Compilation albums

Singles

Awards

AIR Awards
The Australian Independent Record Awards (commonly known informally as AIR Awards) is an annual awards night to recognise, promote and celebrate the success of Australia's Independent Music sector.

|-
| AIR Awards of 2020
| Sidewinder
| Best Independent Heavy Album or EP
| 
|-

References

External links
 Official Site
 Superheist at rateyourmusic.com
 Superheist at last.fm
 Ausmetal guide to Superheist

Australian heavy metal musical groups
Australian nu metal musical groups
Musical groups established in 1993
Victoria (Australia) musical groups
Articles which contain graphical timelines
1993 establishments in Australia